Mercy is a 2014 American supernatural horror film written by Matt Greenberg, directed by Peter Cornwell, and starring Frances O'Connor, Shirley Knight, Chandler Riggs, Joel Courtney, Dylan McDermott and Mark Duplass. It is loosely based on the 1984 short story "Gramma" by Stephen King. It was produced by Jason Blum for his Blumhouse Productions banner and McG. The film was released straight to video by Universal Pictures Home Entertainment on October 7, 2014.

Plot
A single mother (Frances O’Connor) and her two children George (Chandler Riggs) and Buddy (Joel Courtney) go to help take care of their grandmother (Shirley Knight) who has mystical powers.

Cast
 Frances O'Connor as Rebecca McCoy
 Chandler Riggs as George Bruckner
 Joel Courtney as Buddy Bruckner
 Shirley Knight as Mercy 
 Pepper Binkley as Young Mercy
 Dylan McDermott as Jim Swann
 Mark Duplass as Uncle Lanning
 Amanda Walsh as Charlotte
 Harley Graham as Phoebe
 Joe Egender as Wendell

Production
On October 25, 2012, it was announced Peter Cornwell would direct the film from a script by Matt Greenberg, and that Frances O'Connor had been attached to star. On November 30, 2012, it was reported Chandler Riggs had joined the cast of the film, opposite Joel Courtney in the lead roles.

Release
The film was released on video on demand, DVD and Blu-ray by Universal Pictures Home Entertainment on October 7, 2014.

References

External links

2014 horror films
2014 direct-to-video films
2014 films
2010s American films
2010s supernatural horror films
American supernatural horror films
American horror thriller films
Blumhouse Productions films
Demons in film
Wonderland Sound and Vision films
Films based on short fiction
Films based on works by Stephen King
Films produced by Jason Blum
Films about witchcraft
2010s English-language films